Deuce Bigalow: European Gigolo is a 2005 American sex comedy film and a sequel to the 1999 film Deuce Bigalow: Male Gigolo, from Happy Madison Productions, directed by Mike Bigelow. The film was written by Rob Schneider, David Garrett, and Jason Ward; it stars Schneider, Eddie Griffin, and Jeroen Krabbé. The plot involves male prostitute Deuce Bigalow visiting his former pimp T.J. in Amsterdam, and looking for a murderer who is killing the greatest "man-whores" of Europe. Unlike Male Gigolo, distributed by Disney's Touchstone Pictures brand, European Gigolo was released by Sony Pictures Releasing through Columbia Pictures.

The film was panned by critics and was nominated for Worst Picture at the 26th Golden Raspberry Awards, while Schneider won Worst Actor. It grossed $45 million on a $22 million budget.

Plot
Gigolos in Europe are being terrorized by a serial killer. In Malibu, Deuce Bigalow has lost his wife Kate during a shark attack (he keeps her prosthetic leg with him in remembrance) and is invited by his former pimp friend T.J. Hicks to Amsterdam after Deuce accidentally causes an incident involving berserk dolphins. Deuce goes to take his mind off of Kate.

After T.J. shows Deuce his boat, or "float crib," the pair go to a coffee shop where they get high and bump into Heinz Hummer, a German gigolo. After leaving the coffee shop, Deuce finds Hummer dead in an alley, but thinks he is merely stoned and takes the dead gigolo to T.J.'s float crib. When T.J. gets back, he immediately realizes that Hummer is dead. T.J. plans to dump the body, but skeptical of Hummer's reputation of being well-endowed, unzips his pants and examines his genitalia and is caught by a tour boat.

Upon his release from the police station, Deuce finds T.J. at a restaurant and recalls that he saw the killer walking away from Hummer's body. Deuce says it was a woman, so they both figure it was a she-john, a former client of the murdered gigolo. T.J. convinces Deuce to find the killer by becoming a gigolo again, visiting the former clients and "rooting" out the killer. They attend a meeting of the Royal Order of European Man Whores, but fail to procure a list of the clients. Antoine, Deuce's client from the first film manages to get the list and gives to Deuce at a restaurant but is killed by the Man-Whore Killer, which is believed again to be T.J. when he is caught near Antoine's genitals.

Deuce and T.J. visit the first client on the list. While Deuce distracts the woman, T.J. breaks into her residence and finds a brand of lipstick that might be the kind found on all the victims. After leaving, Deuce finds Inspector Gaspar Voorsbach on the street and shows him the lipstick. Gaspar throws the lipstick in the trash, mentioning that the lipstick found on the victims "is a very rare one: Lavender Love #66". As Gaspar enters the police station, his niece Eva approaches him and gives him his lunch. Eva slaps herself three times when Gaspar sneezes. Deuce helps her pick up the things she dropped and Eva explains to Deuce that she has obsessive-compulsive disorder. Deuce sees that she has a painting of a fish, so they go to the Amsterdam aquarium together. Deuce continues to investigate different women from Antoine's list. They include Lily, who speaks through an electrolarynx after a laryngectomy, Svetlana Revenko, who has a penis for a nose as a result of being born and raised in Chernobyl, Greta, a German hunchback and Louisa, a grimy Italian girl who becomes clean and beautiful again after Deuce throws her into a Venice canal and scrubs her. Eventually, Deuce and T.J. infiltrate the Man-Whore offices, where the Man-Whore Killer murders another gigolo and T.J. is arrested when he again is caught inadvertently holding the victim's charred penis.

Deuce then visits Eva's apartment only to discover items used by the Man-Whore Killer. Believing the killer to be Eva, Deuce confides his suspicions to a wary Gaspar, who then reveals herself to Eva as the real Man-Whore Killer before locking her up as a fall girl. Deuce then rides with Gaspar to the Man-Whore Awards Ceremony under the guise of protecting the man-whores. But when Eva escapes and warns Deuce, Gaspar pulls a gun on Deuce and reveals that he is the real Man-Whore Killer. Gaspar tells Deuce that he was once a man-whore hopeful. While Gaspar was observing a demonstration on how to perform a certain sex act, the Portuguese Breakfast, one of his classmates offered to let him use his penis-enlargement pump. When the demonstration ended, Gaspar was horrified the demonstration was his fiancée Elsa. Gaspar was so angry and shocked that he continued to pump until his penis exploded, causing the other men to laugh at him. He blames man-whores for the loss of his fiancée and his penis, and plans to kill them all at their awards ceremony.

At the ceremony, Deuce evacuates the building and gets into a sword fight with Gaspar, during which he mentions the other romantic ways of pleasing a woman; his words move the ladies in the crowd and the male gigolos. Gaspar beats Deuce, but before he can detonate the bomb, Lily and Svetlana distract Gaspar. Lily sprays alcohol all over him through her stoma and then Deuce knocks out Gaspar with a trophy taking the bomb detonator. For his bravery, Deuce is given the Golden Boner award. He shares a passionate kiss with Eva, and accidentally sets off the bomb when the statue's penis bumps the detonator button. Deuce and Eva leave the scene.

The following day, Deuce and Eva come to pick up T.J., who has been released from jail, and tells them that he is entering a brand new prostitution market: gay man-whoring.

In an epilogue: T.J. stops gay man-whoring and becomes a rapper. Deuce and Eva got married with Eva being pregnant. Gaspar is gang raped in prison. Svetlana marries a man with a vagina for a mouth in a wedding where everyone vomitted. Kate's prosthetic leg is turned into a bong by an old Dutch woman.

Cast

The film also includes cameos by Elisabetta Canalis as a castle lady and Dutch actress Chantal Janzen as a Scandinavian porn star. Wes Takahashi, former animator and visual effects supervisor for Industrial Light & Magic, makes a cameo appearance as a news reporter.

Production
Eddie Griffin verified in an interview that "a really old stuffed cat" was used during the cat scene.

Disney rejected the sequel as inappropriate because they wanted the film rated PG-13 (instead of an R rating like the first film). The orphan sequel found a new home at Sony. Disney retains 5% of the box office gross. To promote the film Sony held a "Man-Whore of the Year" contest with Maxim magazine in Las Vegas.

Reception

Box office
Deuce Bigalow: European Gigolo grossed $9,626,287 on its opening weekend, ranking at #5 behind Four Brothers, The Skeleton Key, The Dukes of Hazzard, and Wedding Crashers. The film's opening weekend gross was lower than the $12 million earned by the first film. The movie closed its run with a gross of $22,400,154 in North America and $22,709,407 internationally for a worldwide total of $45,109,561. This was lower than the first film's final gross of $65,538,755 in North America and $92,938,755 worldwide.

Critical response

On Rotten Tomatoes Deuce Bigalow: European Gigolo has an approval rating of 9% based on reviews from 100 critics, with an average rating of 3.30/10. The site's consensus states: "A witless follow-up to the surprise 1999 hit, Deuce Bigalow: European Gigolo is raunchy, politically incorrect, and not particularly funny." On Metacritic the film has a score of 23% based on reviews from 25 critics, indicating "generally unfavorable reviews". Audiences surveyed by CinemaScore gave the film a grade C+.

Michael Rechtshaffen of The Hollywood Reporter wrote: "Every bit as vulgar, sophomoric and thoroughly tasteless as 1999's Deuce Bigalow: Male Gigolo. But what is most annoying is the sequel's capability of inducing laughter even as one hates oneself for so easily succumbing to the total silliness of it all."
Robert Koehler of Variety called it "Rude, crude and, uh, cosmopolitan, Deuce Bigalow: European Gigolo waves the flag for R-rated politically incorrect studio comedy but doesn't top the laugh ratio of the first Deuce misadventure."

Roger Ebert gave the film a rare "zero star" rating, calling it "aggressively bad, as if it wants to cause suffering to the audience", and describing it as "completely beneath contempt" on his show Ebert & Roeper. He ranked it as the worst film of 2005, and ultimately included the movie in his most hated films list. Also on Ebert & Roeper, Richard Roeper called the film "the cinematic equivalent of a bunch of 13-year-old boys in a locker room repeating dirty phrases they've just learned" and "dead on arrival."

Ebert also chastized Rob Schneider for his overly zealous defense of the series, referring to an incident in which Los Angeles Times critic Patrick Goldstein called Schneider a "third-rate comic." Schneider responded by calling Goldstein a "third-rate, unfunny pompous reporter" in a full-page open letter published in Variety and The Hollywood Reporter. Schneider further claimed that Goldstein was unqualified to review the film since he was not a Pulitzer Prize-winning journalist. Ebert, himself having won the Pulitzer Prize, took it upon himself to criticize Schneider in his own review. He ended the review with the quote "Your movie sucks", which would later become the title of a book published by Ebert compiling reviews of films he had awarded below 2/4 stars.

Ebert and Schneider ultimately settled their differences, and Schneider sent his well wishes to Ebert during his recovery from thyroid cancer. Ebert responded, "Rob Schneider might (in my opinion) have made a bad movie. He is not a bad man." After Ebert's death, in a letter to his widow Chaz, Schneider admitted that the situation caused him to "reassess what pictures I really wanted to make."

Schneider was reportedly disappointed with the film, feeling it lacked the heart of the first film.

Accolades
The film was nominated for five Golden Raspberry Awards, including Worst Picture, Worst Screenplay, Worst Remake or Sequel and Worst Screen Couple (Rob Schneider and his diapers) with Schneider winning Worst Actor.

References

External links

 
 
  
 Deuce Bigalow: European Gigolo at Metacritic
 

2005 films
2005 comedy films
2005 directorial debut films
2000s crime comedy films
2000s serial killer films
2000s sex comedy films
American crime comedy films
American sequel films
American serial killer films
American sex comedy films
Columbia Pictures films
2000s English-language films
Films about male prostitution
Films about prostitution in the Netherlands
Films about secret societies
Films produced by Adam Sandler
Films produced by Jack Giarraputo
Films scored by James L. Venable
Films with screenplays by Rob Schneider
Films set in Amsterdam
Films set in Malibu, California
Films shot in Amsterdam
Films shot in Spain
Golden Raspberry Award winning films
Happy Madison Productions films
Stoner films
2000s American films